The Arena Ostrów is an indoor sports arena located in Ostrów Wielkopolski, Poland. The arena is used for basketball and handball games and has a capacity for 3,000 people. The arena was opened on 11 November 2020, after construction started a year earlier. The arena was built by local company Bud-Rem and costed approximately 31 million Polish złoty.

References

Basketball venues in Poland